Kilmersdon is a village and civil parish   on the north eastern slopes of the Mendip Hills in Somerset between the towns of Radstock and Frome. It is located on the B3139 between Wells and Trowbridge in Wiltshire. The settlement is recorded in William I's Domesday book and dates back at least 1,000 years; though the core of the village dates from the mid nineteenth century.  The parish includes the hamlets of
Charlton, South View and Green Parlour.

History

The name Kilmersdon means 'Cynemaer's Hill'.

The parish was part of the Kilmersdon Hundred.

Kilmersdon is said to be the "home" of the Jack and Jill nursery rhyme, the fabled hill being recently restored as part of a local Millennium scheme. Immediately adjacent to the newly restored well is Kilmersdon Primary School, which was established (though not in the current building) in 1707. Other amenities include Norton Garden Machinery (formerly a petrol station and garage) and The Jolliffe Arms named after the Jolliffe family. The Jolliffe's estate is responsible for building much of modern Kilmersdon. The local village main store and combined post office closed in 1998.

Nearby is the Ammerdown Conference and Retreat Centre. Lord Hylton's son Andrew and his family live at Ammerdown — the current Lord Hylton lives in Hemington. The family's estate covers some of the nearby villages including Kilmersdon, and many of the cottages in this estate are owned and run by a charitable housing association set up by Lord Hylton to continue to provide affordable housing for local residents.

A pair of old lodges, gate piers and gates, associated with Ammerdown House, which were built in 1788–94 by James Wyatt, are Grade II* listed buildings and on the English Heritage register of buildings at risk.

Kilmersdon colliery

Located directly above the Somerset coalfield, like much of the area there is evidence to suggest coal extraction in the area from Roman times, with documentary evidence of coal extraction at Kilmersdon starting in 1437. Kilmersdon Colliery was established from February 1875 as part of the Writhlington group of collieries. Access to coal mining beneath Kilmersdon was through a network of tunnels from an entrance at Haydon, a nearby hamlet, resulting in the colliery also being known as Haydon Pit.

Once carting boys had extracted cut coal to the main shaft, it was placed into trams for extraction to the surface, at a maximum rate of 90 trams or 85 tonnes/hour. After transfer there to standard gauge 16-tonne coal wagons, these were individually transported via one of three standard gauge rope worked inclines in the Somerset Coalfield, the last gravity-working industrial rope-incline in the United Kingdom. Sidings were added at the head of the incline in 1900 to allow colliery dirt to be dumped there. At the foot of the incline it junctioned in a triangular-form with the Radstock-to-Frome section of the GWR's Bristol and North Somerset Railway. Here the northern triangular section sidings held empty wagons waiting to be taken up, whilst the southern section sidings contained loaded wagons awaiting pick-up by the GWR.

Nationalised after World War II, as part of the National Coal Board, it became the last colliery to be working the Somerset Coalfield. During its later operating years, the extracted coal was transported under contract to Portishead power station. Closed in August 1973, its structures were demolished and the shaft filled, followed by extensive landscaping. Former joint-railway structures which existed at the foot of the rope-worked incline were demolished in 2005.

The route of the former railway has today been adapted and absorbed into National Cycle Route 24, the Colliers Way. The nearby Kilmersdon Road Quarry is a 0.43 hectare geological Site of Special Scientific Interest. During 2018 the Steam Loco was the main running loco for the Helston Railway and is due to stay until winter 2019, when the locomotives Boiler Ticket Expires.

Governance

Kilmersdon Parish Council has responsibility for local issues. This includes setting an annual precept (local rate) to cover the council’s operating costs and producing annual accounts for public scrutiny. The parish council evaluates local planning applications and works with the local police, district council officers, and neighbourhood watch groups on matters of crime, security, and traffic. The parish council's role also includes initiating projects for the maintenance and repair of parish facilities, as well as consulting with the district council on the maintenance, repair, and improvement of highways, drainage, footpaths, public transport, and street cleaning. Conservation matters (including trees and listed buildings) and environmental issues are also the responsibility of the council.

The village falls within the Non-metropolitan district of Mendip, which was formed on 1 April 1974 under the Local Government Act 1972, having previously been part of Frome Rural District, which is responsible for local planning and building control, local roads, council housing, environmental health, markets and fairs, refuse collection and recycling, cemeteries and crematoria, leisure services, parks, and tourism.

Somerset County Council is responsible for running the largest and most expensive local services such as education, social services, libraries, main roads, public transport, policing and  fire services, trading standards, waste disposal and strategic planning.

It is also part of the Somerton and Frome parliamentary constituency represented in the House of Commons of the Parliament of the United Kingdom. It elects one Member of Parliament (MP) by the first past the post system of election.

Haydon, where the Kilmersdon pit-head was, is in a different local authority area, Bath and North East Somerset, and parliamentary constituency, North East Somerset.

Religious sites

Kilmersdon Church (St Peter and St Paul) is located in the centre of the village. It dates back to the Norman period, though much of the current structure was built during the Victorian era. The tower is in four stages, includes corner buttresses with shafts and pinnacles, and is connected across the angle. The tower contains a ring of six bells, the heaviest being a tenor of 21 cwt. The summit has large corner shafts with pinnacles. There are traceried 3-light bell-chamber windows with a dense quatrefoil interlace and blank 2-light windows on the two lower stages. The flanked niches were for statuary, however this is now missing. The church has a triangular lychgate designed by Sir Edwin Lutyens. It is a Grade I listed building.

Notable people

The children's author Steve Voake was head teacher of Kilmersdon Primary School for eight years.
Comedy actor John Thomson was married in the church.

References

External links

Villages in Mendip District
Somerset coalfield
Civil parishes in Somerset